Dzierzazno may refer to the following places in Poland:
Dzierzążno, Kuyavian-Pomeranian Voivodeship
Dzierżążno, Kartuzy County, Pomeranian Voivodeship
Dzierżążno, Tczew County, Pomeranian Voivodeship